Dean Jagger (November 7, 1903 – February 5, 1991) was an American film, stage, and television actor who won the Academy Award for Best Supporting Actor for his role in Henry King's Twelve O'Clock High (1949).

Early life
Dean Jeffries Jagger (or Dean Ida Jagger) was born in Columbus Grove or Lima, Ohio. Growing up on a farm, he wanted to act, and practiced oratory on cows while working. He later won several oratory competitions. At age 14, he worked as an orderly at a sanatorium.

He dropped out of school several times before finally attending Wabash College. While there he was a member of Lambda Chi Alpha fraternity and played football. He dropped out in his second year, realizing he was not suited to an academic life.

At age 17, he taught all eight grades in a rural elementary school, before heading to Chicago. He studied at the Conservatory of Drama with Elias Day, and through him got a job on the Chautauqua circuit.

Career

Early stage appearances
Jagger studied acting at Chicago's Lyceum Arts Conservatory. He eventually played Young Matt in a production of Shepherd of the Hills on stage in Chicago. This experience resulted in him deciding to try his luck in New York City.

He joined a stock company as Spencer Tracy's replacement. He performed in vaudeville, on the radio and on stage, making his Broadway debut in 1925 in a bit part in a George M. Cohan production. 
He was in a play Remote Control in 1928.

Early films
Jagger visited Los Angeles on a vaudeville show with Irene Rich. While there, he made his film debut in The Woman from Hell (1929) with Mary Astor.  "My good notices," he later recalled, "had a reverse effect on the industry, which was suddenly revolutionized by sound pictures. With the one film to my credit, I was considered part of that group of untouchables – silent film stars." He followed it with Handcuffed (1929).

Jagger decided to move into film production, helping raise money to make a feature that ultimately never was released. He returned to New York City.

Tobacco Road
Jagger's big career break came when cast in a lead role in the play Tobacco Road in 1933. The play was a huge hit and ran until 1941, though Jagger left the show in 1934 to appear in They Shall Not Die, which only ran 62 performances.

Hollywood
In April 1934, Jagger signed a contract with Paramount, for which he made You Belong to Me (1934) with Lee Tracy, then College Rhythm (1934) with Jack Oakie, Behold My Wife! (1934) with Sylvia Sidney, Wings in the Dark (1935) with Myrna Loy and Cary Grant, Home on the Range (1935) with Jackie Coogan, Randolph Scott and Evelyn Brent, Car 99 (1935) with Fred MacMurray and Ann Sheridan, People Will Talk (1935) with Charlie Ruggles, and Men Without Names (1935) with Fred MacMurray. Paramount gave him a lead role in the B Western Wanderer of the Wasteland (1935). He was back in supporting parts in It's a Great Life  (1935), Woman Trap (1936), and 13 Hours by Air (1936).

Victor Halperin borrowed him to play the lead role in Revolt of the Zombies (1936). He went to 20th Century Fox for Pepper (1936) and Star for a Night (1936), then to MGM for Under Cover of Night (1937).

Jagger did Woman in Distress (1937) at Columbia, and Dangerous Number (1937) and Song of the City (1937) at MGM.

Jagger appeared in Republic Pictures' Escape by Night (1937) and Exiled to Shanghai (1937).

Jagger played Michael Drops In in summer stock and returned to Broadway to star in Missouri Legend (1938), which ran 48 performances. He was also in short runs for Everywhere I Roam (1938–39), Brown Danube (1939), Farm of Three Echoes (1939–40) with Ethel Barrymore, and Unconquered (1940) by Ayn Rand.

Brigham Young
Jagger made his breakthrough with his portrayal of Mormon leader Brigham Young in Brigham Young (1940) at 20th Century Fox, alongside Tyrone Power for director Henry Hathaway. He was cast on the basis of his performance in Missouri Legend. According to George D. Pyper, a technical consultant on the film who had personally known Brigham Young, Jagger not only resembled Young, but he also spoke like him and had many of his mannerisms. Thirty-two years later, in 1972 he was baptized a member of the Church of Jesus Christ of Latter-day Saints.

Fox signed him to a long-term contract and put him in Western Union (1941) for Fritz Lang. He was announced for the Biblical film The Great Commandment and a biopic of Lewis and Clark with Randolph Scott, but neither was made.

Instead, Jagger appeared in The Men in Her Life (1941) for Columbia, Valley of the Sun (1942) at RKO, and The Omaha Trail (1942) at MGM.

King Brothers
Jagger had a rare lead role in I Escaped from the Gestapo (1943) for the King Brothers, then went back to supporting roles for The North Star (1943) for Sam Goldwyn. The King Brothers gave him top billing again with When Strangers Marry (1944). Jagger acted in Alaska (1944) at Monogram, which was distributed to King films.

Jagger went to England to appear in I Live in Grosvenor Square (1945) with Anna Neagle and Rex Harrison. He had good roles in Sister Kenny (1946) with Rosalind Russell and Pursued (1947) with Robert Mitchum.

He did Driftwood (1947) for Republic and started appearing on TV shows such as The Philco-Goodyear Television Playhouse, Studio One, and The Chevrolet Tele-Theatre.

Jagger returned to Broadway for Dr. Social (1948), but it had a short run. He had the lead role in 'C'-Man (1949).

Twelve O'Clock High
Jagger received an Academy Award for Best Supporting Actor for his role in Twelve O'Clock High (1949), made at Fox and directed by Henry King. In the film, he played the retired World War I veteran, middle-aged adjutant Major/Lt. Col. Harvey Stovall, who acts as an advisor to the commander, General Savage (Gregory Peck).

Jagger stayed a supporting actor, though, appearing in Sierra (1950) with Audie Murphy at Universal, Dark City (1950) for Hal Wallis, Rawhide (1951) with Hathaway and Power at Fox, and Warpath (1951) at Paramount with Edmond O'Brien and directed by Byron Haskin.

Jagger had a lead role in the strongly anti-communist film My Son John (1952) at Paramount. He was in Denver and Rio Grande (1952), again with Haskin and O'Brien, and episodes of Gulf Playhouse, Lux Video Theatre, Cavalcade of America, Schlitz Playhouse, and Studio 57.

He appeared in the biblical epic The Robe (1953) as the weaver Justus of Cana, and was in Private Hell 36 (1954).

He played retired Army Major General Tom Waverly honored by Bob Wallace (Bing Crosby) and Phil Davis (Danny Kaye) in the musical White Christmas (1954), and an impotent local sheriff in the modern Western Bad Day at Black Rock (1955), starring Spencer Tracy for MGM.   He was also in The Eternal Sea (1955) at Republic, It's a Dog's Life (1955) at MGM, On the Threshold of Space (1956) at Fox, and Red Sundown (1956) at Universal.

For the 1956 British science-fiction film X the Unknown, Jagger refused to work with director Joseph Losey because Losey was on the Hollywood blacklist. Losey came off the project after a few days of shooting and was replaced by Leslie Norman. An alternative version is that Losey was replaced due to illness. Half the budget, $30,000, went to Jagger's fee.

Jagger was in The 20th Century Fox Hour, Three Brave Men (1956), The Great Man (1956) (second-billed to José Ferrer), Zane Grey Theatre, "Bernadine"  (1957) with Pat Boone, an episode of Playhouse 90, Forty Guns (1957) for Sam Fuller, and The Proud Rebel (1958) with Alan Ladd and directed by Michael Curtiz.

Jagger also portrayed the father of Elvis Presley's character in 1958's King Creole, directed by Curtiz.

Jagger was in The Nun's Story (1959), playing the father of Audrey Hepburn's character, and Cash McCall (1960), and played the traveling manager for an evangelist played by Jean Simmons in the acclaimed 1960 drama Elmer Gantry. He was in two failed pilots, including The House on K Street.

In the 1960s, Jagger increasingly worked on television appearing in The Twilight Zone ("Static"), Sunday Showcase, Our American Heritage, General Electric Theater, Dr. Kildare, The Christophers, and The Alfred Hitchcock Hour. He also appeared in the films Parrish (1961), The Honeymoon Machine (1961) and Billy Rose's Jumbo (1962).

Mr. Novak

Jagger achieved success with the television series Mr. Novak (1963–1965), receiving Emmy Award nominations for his role in 1964 and 1965, as well as the California Teachers Association's Communications Award, along with star James Franciscus, in 1963 for his portrayal of high-school principal Albert Vane. Before he left the show to have a major medical operation, though, he was less than happy with the series, clashing repeatedly with the writers and directors and describing "the Mr. Novak company" afterwards as "a mishmash of unbelievable amateurishness."

"It is unforgivable how bad TV is today," he said in 1965. "The people doing it have succumbed to the cliché that there is no time to be good in TV, or that we doing it are lucky to get one good episode out of three. Why?"

Jagger officially left the show in December 1964 because of an ulcer.

Jagger's appearances in the 1960s included episodes of The F.B.I. and The Fugitive, as well as films First to Fight (1967), Firecreek (1968), Day of the Evil Gun (1968), Smith! (1968) with Glenn Ford, The Lonely Profession (1969), Tiger by the Tail (1970), The Kremlin Letter (1970), Men at Law, The Brotherhood of the Bell (1970), again with Ford, and an episode of The Name of the Game.

He had a semiregular role on the series Matt Lincoln (1970) as the father of the title character, and parts in Vanishing Point (1971), Bonanza, and Incident in San Francisco (1971).
 
In 1971, Jagger appeared on The Partridge Family. He played a prospector named Charlie in the Christmas episode "Don't Bring Your Guns to Town, Santa".

Later career
Jagger was in The Glass House (1972), Columbo, Kung Fu (Jagger appeared as Caine's grandfather, who wants little to do with him, but starts Caine on his series-long search for his half-brother Danny), Alias Smith and Jones, Medical Center, The Stranger (1973), The Delphi Bureau, The Lie (1973), Shaft, I Heard the Owl Call My Name (1973), Love Story, The Hanged Man (1974), The Great Lester Boggs (1974), So Sad About Gloria (1975), The Lindbergh Kidnapping Case (1976), Harry O, Hunter, End of the World (1977), and Evil Town (1977).

He played the syndicate boss in Game of Death (1978) as the nemesis of Bruce Lee.

Jagger's later appearances included The Waltons, Gideon's Trumpet (1980) and Alligator (1980).

He won a Daytime Emmy award for a guest appearance in the religious series This Is the Life.

His last role was as Dr. David Domedion in the St. Elsewhere season-three finale "Cheers" in 1985.

Dean Jagger has a star on the Hollywood Walk of Fame at 1523 Vine Street for his contribution to motion pictures.

Personal life and death
When Jagger tried to marry his second wife, Gloria Ling, in 1947, they were denied a marriage license in California due to a state law "forbidding unions between Caucasians and Mongolians [sic]"; Ling's father had been born in China. Within two days, the couple had flown to Albuquerque, New Mexico, and were married under "New Mexico's more liberal statute".

In later life, Jagger suffered from heart disease. He died in his sleep in Santa Monica, California. He was 87. He was survived by his third wife, Etta, a daughter and two stepsons.

Jagger joined the Church of Jesus Christ of Latter-day Saints later in his life.

Complete filmography

 The Woman from Hell (1929) as Jim Coakley
 Handcuffed (1929) as Gerald Morely
 Whoopee! (1930) as Deputy (uncredited)
 You Belong to Me (1934) as Military School Instructor
 College Rhythm (1934) as Coach Robbins
 Behold My Wife! (1934) as Pete
 Home on the Range (1935) as Thurman
 Wings in the Dark (1935) as Top Harmon
 Car 99 (1935) as Trooper Jim Burton
 People Will Talk (1935) as Bill Trask
 Men Without Names (1935) as Jones
 Wanderer of the Wasteland (1935) as Adam Larey
 It's a Great Life (1935) as Arnold
 Woman Trap (1936) as 'Honey' Hogan
 Thirteen Hours by Air (1936) as Hap Waller
 Revolt of the Zombies (1936) as Armand Louque
 Pepper (1936) as Bob O'Ryan
 Star for a Night (1936) as Fritz Lind
 Under Cover of Night (1937) as Alan Shaw
 Woman in Distress (1937) as Fred Stevens
 Dangerous Number (1937) as Vance Dillman
 Song of the City (1937) as Paul Herrick
 Escape by Night (1937) as James 'Capper' Regan
 Exiled to Shanghai (1937) as Charlie Sears
 Having Wonderful Time (1938) as Charlie - Emma's Husband (uncredited)
 Brigham Young (1940) as Brigham Young
 Western Union (1941) as Edward Creighton
 The Men in Her Life (1941) as David Gibson
 Valley of the Sun (1942) as Jim Sawyer
 The Omaha Trail (1942) as 'Pipestone' Ross
 I Escaped from the Gestapo (1943) as Torgut Lane
 The North Star (1943) as Rodion Pavlov
 When Strangers Marry (1944) as Paul Baxter
 Alaska (1944) as U.S. Marshal John Masters
 I Live in Grosvenor Square (1945) (US title: A Yank in London) as Sgt. John Patterson
 Sister Kenny (1946) as Kevin Connors
 Pursued (1947) as Grant Callum
 Driftwood (1947) as Dr. Steve Webster
 C-Man (1949) as Cliff Holden - alias William Harrah
 Twelve O'Clock High (1949) as Major Stovall
 Sierra (1950) as Jeff Hassard
 Dark City (1950) as Capt. Garvey
 Rawhide (1951) as Yancy
 Warpath (1951) as Sam Quade
 My Son John (1952) as Dan Jefferson
 Denver and Rio Grande (1952) as Gen. William J. Palmer
 It Grows on Trees (1952) as Phil Baxter
 The Robe (1953) as Justus
 Executive Suite (1954) as Jesse Q. Grimm
 Private Hell 36 (1954) as Capt. Michaels
 White Christmas (1954) as Major General Thomas F. Waverly
 Bad Day at Black Rock (1955) as Tim Horn
 The Eternal Sea (1955) as Vice-Adm. Thomas L. Semple
 It's a Dog's Life (1955) as Mr. Wyndham
 Red Sundown (1956) as Sheriff Jade Murphy
 On the Threshold of Space (1956) as Dr. Hugo Thornton
 X the Unknown (1956) as Dr. Adam Royston
 Three Brave Men (1956) as John W. Rogers - Secretary of the Navy
 The Great Man (1956) as Philip Carleton
 Bernardine (1957) as J. Fullerton Weldy
 Forty Guns (1957) as Sheriff Ned Logan
 The Proud Rebel (1958) as Harry Burleigh
 King Creole (1958) as Mr. Fisher
 Smoke Jumpers (1958)
 The Nun's Story (1959) as Dr. Van Der Mal
 The House on K-Street (1959 TV movie) as Dr. Morgan Jarrett
 Cash McCall (1960) as Grant Austen
 Elmer Gantry (1960) as William L. Morgan
 Jarrett of K Street (1960 TV movie) as Dr. Morgan Jarrett
 Static (The Twilight Zone) (1961) as Ed Lindsay
 Parrish (1961) as Sala Post
 The Honeymoon Machine (1961) as Admiral Fitch
 Billy Rose's Jumbo (1962) as John Noble
 First to Fight (1967) as Lt. Col. E.J. Baseman
 Firecreek (1968) as Whittier
 Day of the Evil Gun (1968) as Jimmy Noble
 Smith! (1969) as Judge James C. Brown
 The Lonely Profession (1969 TV movie) as Charles Van Cleve
 Tiger by the Tail (1970) as Top Polk
 The Kremlin Letter (1970) as Highwayman
 The Brotherhood of the Bell (1970 TV movie) as Chad Harmon
 Vanishing Point (1971) as Prospector
 Incident in San Francisco (1971 TV movie) as Sam Baldwin
 The Glass House (1972 TV movie) as Warden Auerbach
 The Stranger (1973 TV movie) as Carl Webster
 The Lie (1973 TV movie)
 So Sad About Gloria (1973) as Frederick Wellman
 I Heard the Owl Call My Name (1973 TV movie) as Bishop
 The Hanged Man (1974 TV movie) as Josiah Lowe
 The Great Lester Boggs (1974) as Grandfather Vandiver
 The Lindbergh Kidnapping Case (1976 TV movie) as Koehler
 Evil Town (1977) as Doctor Schaeffer
 End of the World (1977) as Collins
 Game of Death (1978) as Dr. Land
 Gideon's Trumpet (1980 TV movie) as Sixth Supreme Court Justice
 Alligator (1980) as Slade

References

External links

 
 
 
 Dean Jagger papers, MSS 60 at L. Tom Perry Special Collections, Brigham Young University

1903 births
1991 deaths
20th-century American male actors
American male film actors
American male stage actors
American male television actors
Best Supporting Actor Academy Award winners
Converts to Mormonism
Daytime Emmy Award winners
Christians from Ohio
Latter Day Saints from California
Male actors from Ohio
People from Columbus Grove, Ohio
Wabash College alumni
People from Lima, Ohio
Male Western (genre) film actors
Paramount Pictures contract players